"Do It Right" is a song by French DJ and record producer Martin Solveig featuring vocals from Australian singer and rapper Tkay Maidza. It was released as a digital download in France on 20 May 2016 through Spinnin' Records and Big Beat. The song was written by Solveig and Maidza.

At the 2016 South Australian Music Awards, Solveig and Maidza won Best International Collaboration.

Music video
A music video to accompany the release of "Do It Right" was first released onto YouTube on 2 June 2016 at a total length of three minutes and five seconds. The video features the iconic La Muralla Roja building and the surrounding area in Calpe, Spain.

Track listing

Chart performance

Weekly charts

Year-end charts

Certifications

Release date

References

2016 songs
2016 singles
Martin Solveig songs
Tkay Maidza songs
Songs written by Martin Solveig
Songs written by Tkay Maidza